is a passenger railway station in located in the city of  Tsu, Mie Prefecture, Japan, operated by Central Japan Railway Company (JR Tōkai).

Lines
Ise-Hata Station is served by the Meishō Line, and is 11.7 rail kilometers from the terminus of the line at Matsusaka Station.

Station layout
The station consists of a single side platform serving bi-directional traffic. There is no station building, but only a rain shelter built directly on the platform. The station is unattended.

Platforms

Adjacent stations

History 
Ise-Hata Station was opened on March 30, 1930 as a station on the Japanese Government Railways (JGR), which became the Japan National Railways (JNR) after World War II. Freight operations were discontinued in 1963. Along with its division and privatization of JNR on April 1, 1987, the station came under the control and operation of the Central Japan Railway Company.

Passenger statistics
In fiscal 2019, the station was used by an average of 21 passengers daily (boarding passengers only).

See also
 List of railway stations in Japan

References

External links

JR Central home page

Railway stations in Japan opened in 1930
Railway stations in Mie Prefecture
Tsu, Mie